Systena blanda, the palestriped flea beetle, is a species of flea beetle in the family Chrysomelidae. It is found in Central America, North America, and Oceania.

References

Further reading

External links

 

Alticini
Articles created by Qbugbot
Beetles described in 1847